Cremastobombycia kipepeo is a moth of the family Gracillariidae. It is found in eastern Kenya in east African coastal forest.

The length of the forewings is 1.76 mm. The forewings are light ochreous with irroration of darker shading. The hindwings are pale beige with a golden shine. Adults are on wing from late March to early April.

Etymology
The name of this species is derived from kipepeo the common name meaning moth, butterfly in Swahili.

References

Endemic moths of Kenya
Moths described in 2012
Lithocolletinae
Moths of Africa

Lepidoptera of Kenya
Taxa named by Jurate de Prins